Samuel William Hatton (born 7 February 1988) is an English professional footballer who plays for Welwyn Garden City.

Having started his career with Stevenage Borough, he spent time on loan with Northwood, Yeading, Maidenhead United and Diss Town before moving to AFC Wimbledon in 2007 where he notched up 197 league appearances and 22 goals, also helping them earn promotion to the Football League in 2011. He joined Grimsby Town in 2012 where he remained for two seasons. His time with The Dons and Grimsby represent his only spells spent as a professional footballer before later moving on to play for Aldershot Town, Welling United, Hemel Hempstead Town, Bishop's Stortford, Staines Town, Wealdstone and Dartford.

Sam is known for being able to slot in anywhere among the back 4 and also centre mid, he is also known for being extremely comfortable on the ball and his crossing ability and his set piece ability

Club career

Stevenage Borough
Born in St Albans, Hertfordshire, Hatton progressed through the ranks of the Stevenage Borough academy but only made one first team appearance for the Conference National side. His time at Stevenage was frustrating, as he was loaned out a total of five times between 2006 and 2007.

AFC Wimbledon
In the 2007–8 pre-season, Hatton was signed by AFC Wimbledon. He performed consistently over the course of five seasons, at first in midfield before converting to right back and was a part of three promotions, including the historic season that saw the club's promotion to the Football League. He was the club's longest serving player, having made 197 league appearances up to the end of the 2011–12 season.

In May 2011, he was voted by the Wimbledon Independent Supporters Association as player of the 2010–11 season.

On 15 May 2012, Hatton was released by AFC Wimbledon. Manager Terry Brown announced through the AFC Wimbledon website that the club would not take up an option to extend Hatton's contract for the 2012–13 season. Brown described this as: "Definitely one of the hardest decisions I have had to make as a manager."

Grimsby Town
On 23 June 2012, Hatton signed a two-year contract with Conference Premier side Grimsby Town. He was primarily used as Grimsby's first choice right back for both the 2012–13 and 2013–14 seasons. Both seasons ended with the club being defeated in the Conference Play-off semi finals. He was amongst a number of players released on 9 May 2014.

Aldershot Town
After being released by Grimsby Town, Hatton signed for fellow Conference Premier club Aldershot Town in July 2014.

Non-League
Hatton has since played for Welling United, Hemel Hempstead Town, Bishop's Stortford, Staines Town, Wealdstone and Dartford.

In December 2022, Hatton joined Welwyn Garden City, again following manager Marc Weatherstone whom Hatton had played under at Enfield Town and Wingate & Finchley.

International career
During his time with AFC Wimbledon in the Conference Premier, Hatton appeared twice for England C, playing in matches against the Republic of Ireland U23 in 2010 and Belgium U23 in 2011. Hatton was called up to the England C team again in 2012.

Having featured in two out of five of Grimsby's games, Hatton was named in the England C squad to face Belgium in Brussels on Wednesday 12 September in an International Challenge Trophy game.

Honours
AFC Wimbledon
Conference Premier play-offs: 2010–11

References

External links

1988 births
Living people
Sportspeople from St Albans
Footballers from Hertfordshire
English footballers
England semi-pro international footballers
Association football midfielders
Stevenage F.C. players
Northwood F.C. players
Wealdstone F.C. players
Yeading F.C. players
Maidenhead United F.C. players
Diss Town F.C. players
AFC Wimbledon players
Grimsby Town F.C. players
Aldershot Town F.C. players
Dartford F.C. players
Hemel Hempstead Town F.C. players
Welling United F.C. players
Staines Town F.C. players
Bishop's Stortford F.C. players
Enfield Town F.C. players
Wingate & Finchley F.C. players
Welwyn Garden City F.C. players
English Football League players
National League (English football) players
Isthmian League players
Southern Football League players